Çelikhan is a town of Adıyaman Province, Turkey. It is the seat of Çelikhan District. The town is mostly populated by Kurds of the Reşwan tribe and had a population of 8,473 in 2021.

References 

Populated places in Adıyaman Province
Towns in Turkey
Çelikhan District
Kurdish settlements in Adıyaman Province